Cantareus is a genus of air-breathing land snails, a pulmonate gastropod in the family Helicidae, the typical snails. 

Cantareus is a synonym for the genus Helix.

It contains the following species:
 Cantareus apertus (Born, 1778)  synonym: Helix aperta
 Cantareus koraegaelius (Bourguignat in Locard, 1882)
 Cantareus subapertus (Ancey, 1893)
Species brought into synonymy
 Cantareus aspersus (O. F. Müller, 1774): synonym of Cornu aspersum (O. F. Müller, 1774) (superseded combination)
 Cantareus mazzullii synonym of Cornu mazzullii.

References 

 Pallary, P. (1929). Première addition à la faune malacologique de la Syrie. Mémoires présentés a l'Institut d'Égypte, 12: 1-43, pl. 1-3. Le Caire.

External links
 Risso A. (1826). Histoire naturelle des principales productions de l'Europe méridionale et particulièrement de celles des environs de Nice et des Alpes Maritimes, vol. 4. Paris: Levrault. vii + 439 pp., pls 1-12
 Bouaziz-Yahiatene, H., Inäbnit, T., Medjdoub-Bensaad, F., Colomba, M. S., Sparacio, I., Gregorini, A., Liberto, F. & Neubert, E. (2019). Revisited – the species of Tweeting vineyard snails, genus Cantareus Risso, 1826 (Stylommatophora, Helicidae, Helicinae, Otalini). ZooKeys. 876: 1-26.

Helicidae
Gastropod genera
Taxonomy articles created by Polbot